Punjabi alphabet may refer to the:

Gurmukhī alphabet, an Indic script
Shahmukhi alphabet, based on the Arabic script